Joseph Ruiz Samaniego (fl. 1654-1670) was maestro de capilla at the Basilica of Our Lady of the Pillar in Zaragoza. His surviving works include Latin psalms and villancicos.

Works, editions and recordings
 Salmo de difuntos - Verba mea auribus percipe Domine
 Vísperas. Estudio y transcripción de Luis Antonio González Marín, Barcelona, 1999. Vol. LVIII.

References

Spanish composers
Spanish male composers